The 2019 WCT Uiseong International Curling Cup was held from September 29 to October 3 in Uiseong-eup, Uiseong County, South Korea. The total purse for the event was ₩ 55,000,000 on both the men's and women's sides. The event had a mix of teams from Canada, Italy, Norway, Russia, Switzerland, United States, and the host South Korea.

In the Men's event, Canada's Mike McEwen won their first event of the season by defeating Olympic gold medalist John Shuster from the United States 7–4 in the final. Canada's Scott McDonald won the bronze medal with a 10–4 victory over South Korea's Kim Soo-hyuk. 

In the Women's event, USA's Nina Roth with Tabitha Peterson throwing skip rocks defeated Olympic silver medalists Kim Kyeong-ae who took over skipping duties for Kim Eun-jung 5–4 in an extra end. Switzerland's Silvana Tirinzoni took the bronze medal by defeating South Korea's Kim Min-ji 6–4.

Men

Teams

The teams are listed as follows:

Round-robin standings 
Final round-robin standings

Round-robin results 
All draw times are listed in Korean Standard Time (UTC+09:00).

Draw 1
Sunday, September 29, 7:00 pm

Draw 3
Monday, September 30, 3:00 pm

Draw 5
Tuesday, October 1, 7:00 am

Draw 7
Tuesday, October 1, 3:00 pm

Draw 9
Wednesday, October 2, 7:00 am

Draw 10
Wednesday, October 2, 11:00 am

Playoffs

Source:

Semifinals
Wednesday, October 2, 7:00 pm

Bronze medal game
Thursday, October 3, 1:00 pm

Final
Thursday, October 3, 5:00 pm

Women

Teams

The teams are listed as follows:

Round-robin standings 
Final round-robin standings

Round-robin results 
All draw times are listed in Korean Standard Time (UTC+09:00).

Draw 2
Monday, September 30, 11:00 am

Draw 4
Monday, September 30, 7:00 pm

Draw 6
Tuesday, October 1, 11:00 am

Draw 8
Tuesday, October 1, 7:00 pm

Draw 9
Wednesday, October 2, 7:00 am

Draw 11
Wednesday, October 2, 3:00 pm

Playoffs

Source:

Semifinals
Thursday, October 3, 9:00 am

Bronze medal game
Thursday, October 3, 1:00 pm

Final
Thursday, October 3, 5:00 pm

Notes

References

External links
Men's Event
Women's Event

2019 in South Korean sport
2019 in curling
September 2019 sports events in South Korea
International curling competitions hosted by South Korea
Sport in North Gyeongsang Province
Uiseong County